Gemma Collins: Diva is a British television franchise fronted by television personality and businesswoman Gemma Collins. The franchise began in August 2018, when a one-off special titled Gemma Collins: Diva España was commissioned by ITVBe. Following the successful viewing figures of the special, a full series, Diva Forever, was ordered, and ITVBe has since aired various versions of the series including Diva on Lockdown and Diva for Xmas.

Series overview

Diva España

Gemma Collins: Diva España is a one-off 90-minute television special that premiered on ITVBe on 29 August 2018. The special centred on Collins' family life, business decisions and her on-off relationship with James Argent, and was narrated by comedian Joel Dommett. The special received 377,183 viewers in 7-day viewing figures. Following the premiere, OK! magazine reported that viewers wanted the special to be developed into a series, stating that one episode was "not enough".

Diva Forever

Gemma Collins: Diva Forever is a British reality television series that was broadcast from 7 August to 4 September 2019 on ITVBe. Filming for Gemma Collins: Diva Forever began in April 2019. The series was filmed across England and the United States, following Collins' business ventures in locations such as her boutique in Brentwood, Essex.

Diva on Lockdown

Gemma Collins: Diva on Lockdown premiered on ITVBe on 26 April 2020, and was broadcast until 10 May 2020. Filmed primarily within Collins' home, the series was created as a result of the COVID-19 pandemic since Diva Forever & Ever could not be filmed. Collins took to Instagram and said: "We were in the middle of filming my new series of Diva [Forever] with loads of exciting stuff planned. But as you know, we’ve found ourselves in the middle of a pandemic. So here we are now... I'm standing in my living room, with fixed rig cameras all over my house to bring you Diva on Lockdown." Collins continued: "I'm being filmed and I've also got the producers speaking in my ear so if it sounds as if I’m talking to myself... well maybe sometimes I am. I can guarantee though, what you see will definitely be 100% authentic GC. I hope it cheers you up in these difficult times." Commissioner Paul Mortimer commented: "Gemma has proven in all her previous outings across ITV that she is a star who thrives on audience and public interaction. Both generous and warm, the GC is one of the most gregarious personalities in the UK. ITVBe is therefore very grateful to her for finishing production on her new series whilst on lockdown." Diva on Lockdown was filmed at Collins' home in Brentwood, Essex, with fixed rig cameras set in most rooms. The series was filmed at the beginning of April 2020, and aired across three 60-minute episodes. Kate Amarnani and Huw Slipper act as executive producers for the series, while Sophie Bush produces.

During filming, Diva on Lockdown faced criticism from local residents due to crew members travelling to and from Collins' house. Rebecca Carter of Entertainment Daily reported that "neighbours and locals have raised eyebrows about people traipsing to sit outside Gemma's house to film a reality show when people are dying from this crisis". Representatives of ITV responded: "Safeguarding the well-being of everyone involved in our shows is our priority. Careful new ways have been established to allow new programmes to be created to help keep viewers entertained at this difficult time, whilst following government guidelines. With the appropriate guidance, new measures have been put in place covering production practice for all crew and Gemma." Reviewing the programme, Sarah Carson of i newspaper wrote: "No other factual television is churned out as quickly, yet already this feels like a relic. It is jarring, familiar, revelatory and damning to watch – these stars display the same naivety we shared weeks ago. It’s often said that in future, we’ll look back on reality TV and despair at society. Who could have thought that Gemma Collins would narrate such a landmark moment – or that we’d be looking back quite so soon?", adding that the series "has captured the coronavirus apocalypse better than any documentary".

Diva Forever & Ever
Gemma Collins: Diva Forever & Ever is a reality television series broadcast on ITVBe from 13 October to 3 November 2020. Filming for the series commenced in February 2020, but in March 2020, Collins announced that filming had been paused due to the COVID-19 pandemic. As a result, ITVBe commissioned a spinoff series filmed in Collins' home, Diva on Lockdown. In August 2020, Collins confirmed on her Instagram page that the series had reentered production.

Diva for Xmas

Gemma Collins: Diva for Xmas is the second one-off special in the Diva franchise, following Diva España in 2018. The special involves Collins visiting former The Only Way Is Essex co-star Chloe Sims, visiting a turkey sanctuary, attending a photoshoot for a range of Christmas cards and recording a cover of "Baby, It's Cold Outside" with former Celebrity Big Brother co-star Darren Day. At the end of the special, the music video for Collins' and Day's song was premiered. Filming for the episode occurred in November 2020, and it premiered on ITVBe on 9 December 2020 to 200,552 viewers.

References

External links
 
 
 
 
 

2018 British television series debuts
2020 British television series endings
2010s British reality television series
2020s British reality television series
English-language television shows
ITV reality television shows
Television series by All3Media
Television productions suspended due to the COVID-19 pandemic